is a Japanese football player for YSCC Yokohama.

Club statistics
Updated to 23 February 2016.

References

External links

1986 births
Living people
Kanto Gakuin University alumni
Association football people from Kanagawa Prefecture
Japanese footballers
J3 League players
Japan Football League players
YSCC Yokohama players
Association football forwards